British rapper and singer-songwriter Bree Runway has released four extended plays (EPs) and 16 singles (including two as a featured artist). She released her debut mixtape titled 2000and4Eva, via EMI Records in November 2020.

Mixtapes

Extended plays

Singles

As lead artist

As featured artist

Guest appearances

Music videos

Guest appearances

Notes

References 

Discographies of British artists
Hip hop discographies